Sun Tran is the public transit system serving the city of Tucson, Arizona. In addition to more than 40 bus routes, the system also includes the Sun Link modern streetcar line.

History

According to David Leighton, historian for the Arizona Daily Star newspaper, Sun Tran's history began in 1897 with the organization of the Tucson Street Railway, which by the following year was providing Tucsonans with regular mule-powered streetcar service. Streetcar tracks existed in parts of present-day downtown and to the University of Arizona. Within a few years, lack of profit caused the company to be sold and it was reorganized as Tucson Rapid Transit Co. (TRT). It shortly came under common ownership with Tucson Gas, Electric Light and Power Co.

By 1906, mules were replaced by electricity as the driving force behind the streetcars in Tucson. Four years later, TRT published its intent to increase the amount of track for its electric cars but insufficient money prevented this from occurring. In 1910, TRT owner United States Light and Traction was acquired by the newly formed Federal Light and Traction.

In October 1925, Tucson Rapid Transit Co., having realized that buses were more flexible and economical to run than streetcars and were the future of public transportation in the Old Pueblo, bought the White Star Bus Line. This small bus company would become the basis for TRT's bus service in town. Also around the same time, Roy Laos Sr., noting the lack of transit service to the south and west sides of town founded the Occidental Bus Line to serve these areas. Laos' bus service would later be called Old Pueblo Transit.

In 1930, control of Federal Light and Traction was acquired by Cities Service. On January 1, 1931, Tucson Rapid Transit formally ended all electric streetcar service in town. From this day forward it became strictly a bus company. Five years later, Jacob M. Bingham established the Mountain View Bus Line with one bus. His goal was to provide service to outlying areas that TRT didn't serve but turning a profit or even just paying his bills was difficult and soon enough TRT bought his small enterprise.

During World War II, ridership increased to a large degree, in part due to tire and fuel rationing that was carried out to support the war effort. The secondary reason for the surge was the need for public transportation for workers in the growing defense industry.

After the passage of the Public Utility Holding Company Act of 1935, Federal Light and Traction/Cities Service was forced to sell most of their operations. TRT was sold to W. Culver White, John B. Tigrett, A.V. Lindseth and L.A. Tanner. Tucson Gas & Electric was sold in a public offering.

In late 1951, the Hughes Missile Plant (now called Raytheon Missiles & Defense) was finished and was operating with a small number of employees. Competition for ridership to the new factory between Old Pueblo Transit and Tucson Rapid Transit became heated and OPT filed an injunction in court to prevent TRT from providing service for employees. Early the following year, the Arizona Corporation Commission decided against OPT and allowed TRT to also provide bus service to the plant.

The 1950s and 1960s saw a steady decline in riders for Tucson Rapid Transit. Even a change in ownership in 1965 to American Transit Corp. (and a name change to Tucson Transit Corp.) and the installation of air conditioners seemed to do little for the failing bus service. As a result, in 1969, the City of Tucson acquired TTC, changing the name to the City of Tucson Transit System.

In 1975, a contest was held to give a new name to the bus system, with Benjamin Rios, a 25-year-old University of Arizona architecture student from Mexico, submitting the winning entry: “Sun Tran.” His prize was a $150 portable television.

Three years later, Sun Tran bought its competition the Old Pueblo Transit Co. and the city had but one bus service for riders. The year 1987 saw the opening of the Roy Laos Transit Center at 205 W Irvington Road, and in 1991, the Ronstadt Transit Center opened in downtown.

In 2010, Sun Tran received shipment of its first bus using hybrid technology and two years later Sun Tran's Northwest Bus Facility located at 3920 N. Sun Tran Blvd was completed.

Awards
Sun Tran won the America's Best Transit System award for 1988 and 2005 from the American Public Transportation Association in the category of 4 to 30 million annual passenger trips. Also, Sun Tran was awarded as the Arizona's Best Transit System for 2004 and 2012.

Fares
NOTE: all fares are free since late March 2020 due to the ongoing COVID-19 outbreak up to further notice. Until driver shields are in place, all riders must board & alight at the rear doors.

The basic fare is $1.75. Reduced fare for low-income, persons with disabilities, seniors at least 65 and Medicare cardholders is $0.75 (with a valid SunGO ID & card). The express bus fare is $2.35. No fares apply to kids under 6 with fare-paying rider, limit 3. All fares can be paid with a SunGo card, which utilises smart card technology, and can be loaded with cash value or passes. 24-hour passes ($4) & 30-day tickets ($48) are available. The University of Arizona provides discounted passes for eligible students, faculty and staff through the UA's Parking and Transportation Services.

Fleet

Current fleet
Sun Tran has an active fleet of 237 buses.

Retired Fleet

Note that this is by no means a complete listing of retired vehicles that have operated for Sun Tran and/or its predecessors.

Current Routes 

Sun Tran operates 29 regular routes and 13 express routes, as well as 10 Sun Shuttle routes, a neighborhood transit service. Most regular routes provide service from 6am to 11pm. A few routes provide service until midnight. Sun Tran does not provide overnight service.

Regular Routes

Express Routes

Alternative propulsion 
For at least the next five years, Sun Tran will use more biodiesel buses. Biodiesel is a cleaner than regular diesel. Sun Tran plans to buy an additional 119 biodiesel buses over its five-year contract with bus manufacturer Gillig Corp. buses are also capable of running on regular diesel, but Sun Tran does not use petrodiesel in any of its buses. Sun Tran uses B20 and B5 biodiesel blends in its 114 biodiesel buses. It is believed that the increased use of biodiesel avoided a potential fare increase and fuel surcharge in July 2008.

Customer service 
Sun Tran publishes a transit book, known as the Ride Guide, and it is updated twice yearly, on February and on August. It contains maps and schedules for all regular and express routes. Copies are available at multiple locations around town, including the Sun Tran offices, many public libraries, community colleges, major malls, pass sales outlets, at other civic facilities around the metropolitan area, and on the buses themselves. The Ride Guide is also available online at the Sun Tran website. Additionally, route schedules are posted at the transit centers in the City of Tucson.

A customer service call center is operated for passengers to plan their bus trips with the assistance of a live customer service representative, information for Sun Tran, Sun Express, Sun Shuttle and Sun Link, fares and SunGO information, detours, comments and questions. The Sun Tran website also has an online trip planning function, and includes all schedules and maps featured in the Ride Guide.

Regional Transportation Plan and streetcar system 

In May 2006, voters in Tucson approved a Regional Transportation Plan (a comprehensive bus transit/streetcar/roadway improvement program), and its funding via a new 20-year half-cent sales tax increment. The centerpiece of the Regional Transportation Plan is Sun Link, a  modern streetcar system (inspired by the successful Portland Streetcar in Oregon) that travels through the downtown area, connecting the main University of Arizona campus with the Mercado District master plan area (known at that time as Rio Nuevo) on the western edge of downtown.

In December 2010, a $63 million federal TIGER grant was awarded to the City of Tucson, meeting most of a remaining funding gap and allowing the modern streetcar project to move forward. An additional $6 million of federal funding was obtained through the Federal Transit Administration's New Starts program. Funding also came from utilities for relocation and improvements along the streetcar route, most significantly $10.6 million from Tucson Water.

The Sun Link name was officially announced in the spring of 2012. Construction began in April 2012, with revenue service beginning in July 2014.

 
Oregon-based United Streetcar manufactured the Sun Link vehicles.  Sun Link maintains a fleet of eight vehicles, using up to six cars at once. Tucson placed an initial $26 million order for seven cars in June 2010.  The eighth car was ordered for an additional $3.6 million in July 2012 in order to satisfy FTA requirements for a second spare.  United's first model 200 car arrived in Tucson by flatbed truck on August 30, 2013.

Sun Link is double-tracked, replacing a single-track configuration previously used by Old Pueblo Trolley (OPT), a volunteer-run heritage streetcar operation, begun in 1993, mainly used by tourists and local patrons (including University of Arizona students) of the numerous small shops, bars and restaurants along the line. The maintenance facility is located just west of the OPT car barn and yard on 8th Street west of 4th Avenue. OPT last ran on October 31, 2011, when service was suspended for Sun Link construction; the plan was for Old Pueblo Trolley to share operations, trackage and stations with Sun Link, but no date has yet been set for OPT service to resume.

Regional seamless transit system 

On January 22, 2009, a regional seamless transit system was unveiled that helps to better unify the various public transit services in and around the Tucson metropolitan area. One change was the renaming of several of the services under the "Sun" moniker: the Sun Tran express bus routes become Sun Express; Van Tran (paratransit) becomes Sun Van, circulator routes in outlying areas become Sun Connect, and RideShare (carpooling) becomes Sun RideShare.  Along with this name change comes a new logo and color scheme, replacing the old red, yellow, and white with a blue, yellow, silver, and white livery that extends across not only the Sun Tran buses, but the other services as well (even the renderings and computer animations of the then-under-development Sun Link streetcar were converted to the new design).  The new livery was introduced into service on February 16, 2009, with the addition of 47 new Sun Tran buses and 42 Sun Van (formerly Van Tran) paratransit vehicles to the fleet.  Current vehicles will keep their existing liveries until they are either overhauled or replaced.  Also in the works are new fare machines that allow a single "smart card" to pay fares on Sun Tran, Sun Express, Sun Connect, and the downtown streetcar; and improved signage at bus stops and transit centers.

Sun Connect service started on May 4, 2009, under the name Sun Shuttle, with routes to the north and northwest, Green Valley, and Sahuarita.

References

External links 
 Sun Tran home page
 City of Tucson Transit Services
 Regional Transportation Authority website

Transit agencies in Arizona
Bus transportation in Arizona
Transit authorities with natural gas buses
Transportation in Tucson, Arizona
1969 establishments in Arizona